Heikant is a hamlet in the municipality of Rucphen, in the Dutch province of North Brabant. It is located about 2 km southeast of Sprundel.

Populated places in North Brabant
Rucphen